Arne F. Waldstein (January 17, 1925 – February 8, 2014) was an American politician who served in the Iowa Senate from 1979 to 1987.

He died on February 8, 2014, in Waverly, Iowa at age 89.

References

1925 births
2014 deaths
Republican Party Iowa state senators
People from Buena Vista County, Iowa
20th-century American politicians